Meliandou is a village in Guéckédou Prefecture, in the Nzérékoré Region of southern Guinea. Medical researchers believe that the village was the location of the first known case of Ebola virus disease in the epidemic in West Africa. The patient zero of Ebola was a two-year-old boy who died in 2013. The boy's pregnant mother, sister, and grandmother also became ill with symptoms consistent with Ebola infection and died. People infected by those victims later spread the disease to other villages.

Prior to the Ebola outbreak, the villagers sold their farm produce to the nearby town of Guéckédou. , they found themselves unable to sell their products anymore.

See also 
 Ebola virus epidemic in Guinea

References

External links 
 High-resolution map of Meliandou area provided by European Union for ReliefWeb

Populated places in the Nzérékoré Region
2014 in Guinea
Health in Guinea
Index cases